Djezon Boutoille (born November 9, 1975) is a French football former player and current manager who manages lower league side Union Sportive Gravelines Football.

Career
Boutoille having previously played for Lille OSC and Amiens SC.

Coaching career
On 25 March 2009, Boutoille was named Calais' manager, replacing Sylvain Jore. He managed Calais until the end of the 2016 17 season.

Achievements
 Ligue 2 champion in 2000 with Lille.

References

External links

1975 births
Living people
French footballers
French football managers
Ligue 1 players
Ligue 2 players
Championnat National players
Championnat National 2 players
Lille OSC players
Calais RUFC players
Amiens SC players
Calais RUFC managers
Association football forwards